The 7th Jutra Awards were held on February 20, 2005 to honour films made with the participation of the Quebec film industry in 2004.

Winners and nominees

References

2005 in Quebec
Jutra
05
Jutra